Calvin Starlin Pryor III (born July 2, 1992) is a former American football strong safety. He was drafted by the New York Jets in the first round of the 2014 NFL Draft. He played college football at Louisville. He has also spent time with the Cleveland Browns and Jacksonville Jaguars.

High school career
A native of Port St. Joe, Florida, Pryor attended the local high school where he was a three-sport athlete in football, basketball and baseball. He played both running back and safety for the Tiger Sharks.

Considered a three-star by Rivals.com, Pryor was rated the 31st-best safety prospect in the nation.

College career
Pryor attended the University of Louisville from 2011 to 2013. During his tenure, he accumulated 218 total tackles, including 11 for losses, two sacks, seven interceptions, and nine forced fumbles. He was a second-team All-Big East selection as a sophomore, and a first-team All-AAC selection as a junior.

On December 29, 2013, Pryor announced that he would forgo his remaining eligibility at Louisville and enter the 2014 NFL Draft.

Professional career

New York Jets
Pryor was drafted by the New York Jets as the 18th pick of the first round of the 2014 NFL Draft.

On May 2, 2017, the Jets declined Pryor's fifth year option after the draftings of safeties Jamal Adams and Marcus Maye.

Cleveland Browns
On June 1, 2017, Pryor was traded to the Cleveland Browns in exchange for Demario Davis. He was released on September 7, 2017 due to a fight with teammate Ricardo Louis.

Jacksonville Jaguars
On September 8, 2017, Pryor was claimed off waivers by the Jacksonville Jaguars. He was placed on injured reserve on September 18, 2017. He was activated off injured reserve to the active roster on November 18, 2017. He was released by the Jaguars on December 2, 2017.

References

External links

 New York Jets bio
 Louisville Cardinals bio

1992 births
Living people
People from Port St. Joe, Florida
Players of American football from Louisiana
American football safeties
Louisville Cardinals football players
New York Jets players
Cleveland Browns players
Jacksonville Jaguars players